Robbery (AKA: A Wayfarer Compelled to Disrobe Partially) is an 1897 British short black-and-white silent comedy film directed by Robert W. Paul, featuring a wayfairer who is forced to handover his valuables and some of his clothes to an armed robber. The film, "although only intended as a comedy," according to Michael Brooks of BFI Screenonline, "in fact reveals how the stripping of one's Victorian 'uniform' also meant the stripping of one's integrity," and, "turns the viewer into an accomplice, since it forces us to watch the man's humiliation head-on, ultimately aligning ourselves not with the victim but with the thief." It is included on the BFI DVD R.W. Paul: The Collected Films 1895-1908.

References

External links
 

1897 films
British black-and-white films
British silent short films
1897 comedy films
British comedy short films
1890s crime films
1897 short films
1890s British films
Films directed by Robert W. Paul
Silent comedy films
Films about robbery